Patryk Zaucha (born 19 April 2000) is a Polish footballer who plays as a defender for Cracovia.

References

External links
 
 

2000 births
Living people
Association football defenders
Polish footballers
Ekstraklasa players
III liga players
MKS Cracovia (football) players
Sportspeople from Tarnów
Poland youth international footballers